Cody's Books (19562008) was an independent bookstore based in Berkeley, California. It "was a pioneer in bookselling, bringing the paperback revolution to Berkeley, fighting censorship, and providing a safe harbor from tear gas directed at anti-Vietnam War protesters throughout the 1960s and 1970s."

History 

The first store opened in 1956 on Euclid Avenue in Berkeley, California. It was founded by Fred (1916–1983) and Pat (1923–2010) Cody. It moved to a larger location on Telegraph Avenue in 1960 and moved to another Telegraph Avenue location in 1965. In 1968, "Cody's served as a first-aid station […] when anti-war protesters were tear gassed and clubbed just outside its Telegraph Avenue doors […] the store's employees were tending the woundedanti-war protesters teargassed and clubbed by the police and the National Guard as protests broke out on Telegraph Avenue." In the early 1970s, Mario Savio worked as a clerk at the Telegraph Avenue store.

In 1977, the Codys sold the store to Andy Ross, who owned it until 2006.

Cody's was best known for its extensive selection of literary, political, and scholarly titles.

On February 28, 1989, unknown persons threw a firebomb through the window of the store. It was thought that this was in response to the prominent display of Salman Rushdie's The Satanic Verses, which had been banned by a fatwa by Iranian clerics one month prior. An undetonated pipe bomb was subsequently discovered in the store. In response the staff unanimously voted to keep the book on display despite the attack and the increasing willingness of chain bookstores to bow to pressure to withdraw it.

Cody's pioneered a well-regarded author-reading series. Some prominent authors and notables who appeared at Cody's were: Tom Robbins, Norman Mailer, Ken Kesey, Alice Walker, Allen Ginsberg, Maurice Sendak, Bill Clinton, Jimmy Carter, Muhammad Ali, and Salman Rushdie.

In the 1980s, Cody's was a plaintiff in several anti-trust lawsuits charging that independent book sellers were discriminated against in favor of chain stores. Cody's owner, Andy Ross, was a prominent spokesperson supporting independent businesses against chain stores and Internet retailers.

Neighborhood booksellers 

Cody's was a core bookseller among a coterie of independent booksellers, which included Moe's Books (located nearly next door to Cody's), Shakespeare & Co., Black Oak Books, Diesel, and others, all located in the region from north Berkeley to north Oakland. This region includes the University of California, Berkeley. Together they were members of a significant regional supporter of independent bookselling, The Northern California Independent Bookseller's Association, or NCIBA.

Moves and closure 

The Telegraph store was the flagship store until it closed in 2006, sparking a controversy in the local press over the cause. One explanation given for the closure was that it was caused by pressure from corporate chains like Borders.  the location was still vacant.

The Cody's San Francisco location closed in 2007 for a similar reason. Cody's was sold to Japanese book distributor Yohan, Inc. in September 2006.

In March 2008, the last remaining store moved from 4th Street to its final location on Shattuck Avenue due to a rent increase. Financial pressures forced the closure of the store for good on June 20, 2008.  The 2008 PBS TV documentary Paperback Dreams chronicles the related histories of Kepler's Books in Menlo Park, California and Cody's Books.

Timeline 

Stores:
 Euclid Avenue, Berkeley, 1956–1960
 Telegraph Avenue and Dwight, Berkeley, 1960–1965
 2454 Telegraph Avenue at Haste Street, Berkeley, 1965July 10, 2006
 2 Stockton Street, San Francisco, 2005–2007
 1730 4th St., Berkeley 1997–March 2008
 2201 Shattuck Ave., Downtown Berkeley April 1, 2008 – June 19, 2008 then a final sale starting from August 14–August 22 or August 23, 2008

See also 

 Kepler's Books
 Printers Inc. Bookstore

References

Further reading 
 Cody's Books : the life and times of a Berkeley bookstore, 1956–1977 by Pat and Fred Cody, San Francisco : Chronicle Books, 1992
 Perman, Stacy. "Autopsy of an Indie Bookseller." Businessweek. January 12, 2009.

External links 
 Cody's Books: Paperback Dreams (archived)
 "Last Cody's Bookstore Bids Farewell to Berkeley" - The Daily Californian

Bookstores in the San Francisco Bay Area
Independent bookstores of the United States
Companies based in Berkeley, California
Culture of Berkeley, California
History of the San Francisco Bay Area
American companies established in 1956
Bookstores established in the 20th century
Retail companies established in 1956
Retail companies disestablished in 2008
1956 establishments in California
2008 disestablishments in California
Defunct companies based in the San Francisco Bay Area
Defunct retail companies of the United States